Rugby Club Los Matreros, simply known as Los Matreros, is an Argentine rugby union and field hockey club sited in Morón, Greater Buenos Aires. The rugby union team is also member of the Unión de Rugby de Buenos Aires (URBA).

History

The team was founded on August 28, 1928 and less than a year later it would join the Argentine Rugby Union to play at the third division, competing with 22 teams.

The club's name was chosen as a tribute to the Martín Fierro, the most renowned poem of the "Gauchesco" literature in Argentina. Martín Fierro (the character) is described by the author, José Hernández as a "matrero" ("smart", "clever" in English) gaucho. The election of the club name is also related to the place where it was founded: Morón (today a populous city of the Greater Buenos Aires) was an uninhabited land by the time and some battles for the independence had been fought there in the past.

In 2011 Los Matreros was relegated to second division after finishing 11th in Zona Reubicación.

References

External links
 Facebook page
 Twitter page

m
m
m
m